USS Kingbird (AMc-56) was a wooden dragger acquired by the U.S. Navy, just prior to World War II, for clearing coastal minefields.

The first Kingbird (AMC-56), ex-Governor Saltonstall, was built in 1939 by the Quincy Drydock & Yacht Co., Quincy, Massachusetts, acquired by the Navy 26 December 1940, and placed in service as a coastal minesweeper in the 1st Naval District 24 July 1941.

Following assignment to Portsmouth, New Hampshire, in January 1942, Kingbird operated in the 1st Naval District as a coastal minesweeper for over 2 years. She was reclassified IX-176 10 July 1944 and placed out of service 28 July 1944 for use in training sound operators for new submarines.

Kingbird was transferred to the War Shipping Administration 7 June 1946 for disposal. Her fate is unknown.

References

External links 
 NavSource Online: Mine Warfare Vessel Photo Archive - Kingbird (AMc 56)- IX-176

Ships built in Quincy, Massachusetts
1939 ships
Minesweepers of the United States Navy
World War II minesweepers of the United States